Phillip Pine (July 16, 1920 – December 22, 2006) was an American film and television actor, writer, film director, and producer. Despite incorrect biographical information repeated on many entertainment sites, he was not related to Robert Pine or Chris Pine.

In a 1957 episode of the same series, Pine again played Hardin.  Later that year, he appeared on Gunsmoke, as “Vint” - a cheating card dealer turned murderer in the episode “Moon”.

Pine appeared in two episodes of Adventures of Superman titled "The Mystery of the Broken Statues" and "The Case of the Talkative Dummy". In the latter, he played a theater usher who was part of a robbery gang (see picture in infobox). He appeared in two episodes of Wagon Train titled "The Ben Courtney Story" and "The Esteban Zamora Story" in 1959. Pine was in the second episode of The Outer Limits entitled "The Hundred Days of the Dragon". He also appeared in two episodes of The Twilight Zone, "The Four of Us Are Dying", and "The Incredible World of Horace Ford". Pine appeared as mobster Jack Zuta in the third episode of The Untouchables titled "The Jake Lingle Killing" and in 1962 he co-starred in the episode "The Whitey Steele Story". He also appeared in The Fugitive.  He made a 1964 appearance as Phillip Stewart in the Perry Mason episode, "The Case of the Wednesday Woman". In 1964 Pine guest starred on Combat! as Pvt. Steve Cantrell in the third season episode "Birthday Cake". He played a World War II submarine captain marooned inside an underwater cave with four other survivors in the 1965 Voyage to the Bottom of the Sea episode "And Five of Us Are Left".

Pine played a confessed bank robber in the ninth episode of the television series Peter Gunn entitled "Image of Sally", first aired November 17, 1958.

In 1967, Pine appeared in an episode of The Invaders entitled "Genesis". Pine also appeared in an episode of Rawhide entitled "Incident at Dangerfield Dip". He also played a gangster known only as "Mark" in Irving Lerner's film noir classic, Murder by Contract.

He appeared in an episode of Kojak (season 5) called "Cry for the Children" as "Eddie Creagan", in an episode of Ironside (season 3) called "Alias Mrs Braithwaite?" and in Hawaii Five-O (season 1) called "Full Fathom 5". Notably, he played a Japanese man in a later Hawaii Five-O episode called "Which Way Did They Go?"

In 1969, Pine appeared in a Star Trek episode of season 3, "The Savage Curtain", as the genocidal Earth warlord Colonel Green. Pine also appeared in the first season of Barnaby Jones in the episode titled "Murder in the Doll's House" (03/25/1973).

Partial filmography

The Sailor Takes a Wife (1945) - Aide (uncredited)
The Street with No Name (1948) - Monk (uncredited)
I Shot Jesse James (1949) - Man in Saloon
The Set-Up (1949) - Souza
Red Light (1949) - Pablo Cabrillo
Battleground (1949) - G.I. Non-Com (uncredited)
D.O.A. (1949) - Angelo (uncredited)
My Foolish Heart (1949) - Sgt. Lucey
The Flame and the Arrow (1950) - One of Dardo's Band (uncredited)
Insurance Investigator (1951) - 2nd Hood
The Wild Blue Yonder (1951) - Sgt. Tony
Hoodlum Empire (1952) - Louis Barretti
Black Tuesday (1954) - Fiaschetti (uncredited)
The Phantom from 10,000 Leagues (1955) - George Thomas
The Price of Fear (1956) - Vince Burton
Men in War (1957) - Sgt. Riordan
Gunsmoke (1957) - Vin
Desert Hell (1958) - Cpl. Carlo Parini
Murder by Contract (1958) - Marc
The Lost Missile (1958) - Dr. Joe Freed 
The Big Fisherman (1959) - Lucius
Combat!, "Birthday Cake" (1964) - Pvt. Steve Cantrell
Brainstorm (1965) - Dr. Ames
Dead Heat on a Merry-Go-Round (1966) - George Logan
Project X (1968) - Dr. Lee Craig
Hook, Line & Sinker (1969) - Head Surgeon
The Cat Ate the Parakeet (1972) - Earl
Glass Houses (1972) - Ted
Money to Burn (1983) - Dean Hayden
Run If You Can (1988) - Kudelski

References

External links

Superman episode with Phil Pine

1920 births
2006 deaths
Male actors from California
American male film actors
American male television actors
People from Hanford, California
Film directors from California
20th-century American male actors